The 13167 / 68 Kolkata–Agra Cantonment Express is an Express train belonging to Indian Railways – Eastern Railway zone that runs between Kolkata Chitpur &  in India.

It operates as train number 13167 from Kolkata Chitpur to Agra Cantonment and as train number 13168 in the reverse direction, serving the states of West Bengal, Jharkhand, Bihar and Uttar Pradesh.

Coaches

The 13167 / 68 Kolkata–Agra Cantonment Express has 1 AC 2 tier, 5 AC 3 tier, 9 Sleeper class, 4 General Unreserved & 2 EOG (Linke Hofmann Busch Rake) coaches. It carry a pantry car .

As is customary with most train services in India, coach composition may be amended at the discretion of Indian Railways depending on demand.

Service

Routeing

Traction

As sections of the route are yet to be fully electrified, a Howrah-based WAP-4 hauls the locomotive from Kolkata Chitpur until  handing over to a Lucknow-based WDM-3A which powers the train for the remainder of its journey.

Operation

13167 Kolkata–Agra Cantonment Express runs from Kolkata Chitpur every Thursday reaching 
Agra Cantonment on the next day .

13168 Agra Cantonment–Kolkata Express runs from Agra Cantonment every Saturday reaching Kolkata Chitpur on the next day .

References 

 http://www.nr.indianrailways.gov.in/view_detail.jsp?id=0,4,268&dcd=3451
 http://erail.in/13167-koaa-agc-expres
 https://archive.today/20141022120340/http://www.thestatesman.net/news/38859-howrah-katihar-express-to-run-on-tuesdays.html
 http://erail.in/13168-agc-koaa-exp
 https://www.youtube.com/watch?v=fcfBMY263mM

External links

Transport in Kolkata
Trains from Agra
Express trains in India
Rail transport in West Bengal
Rail transport in Jharkhand
Rail transport in Bihar